Ronin is an alias used by multiple characters in the . It was first adopted by Maya Lopez in The New Avengers #11 (November 2005) by Brian Michael Bendis and Joe Quesada. Following this, the Ronin mantle has been taken up by characters such as Clint Barton, Alexei Shostakov, Eric Brooks, and Bullseye.

The Clint Barton incarnation of Ronin appears in the Marvel Cinematic Universe film Avengers: Endgame (2019) and the Disney+ series Hawkeye (2021), portrayed by Jeremy Renner.

Publication history
The persona of Ronin was created by Brian Michael Bendis and Joe Quesada. Bendis stated that the original intention was Matt Murdock as the true identity of Ronin but could not do so due to a conflict with plans in the Daredevil comic book title.

Fictional character biography

Maya Lopez

The original iteration of Ronin first appeared in New Avengers #11 (November 2005) (although the character appeared on the covers of several earlier issues). Maya Lopez was the first person to take on the Ronin identity.

Clint Barton

The second iteration of Ronin first appeared in New Avengers #27 (April 2007). Clinton "Clint" Barton is the second person to have used the Ronin identity.

Alexei Shostakov

Writer Jim McCann revealed "We're going to learn that there is far more to the Ronin identity than anyone knew, pre-dating [the first two versions] before [the third iteration]. Why does Ronin exist? That's a central mystery we will tackle." A Life Model Decoy of Alexei Shostakov is the third individual who dons the Ronin identity.

Eric Brooks

A character (whose identity is initially kept from the reader) is introduced in the Mighty Avengers and dons the Halloween-type Spider Hero costume during the Infinity storyline, and is supplied with the Ronin costume from a "big box of Clint Barton's old stuff" during the Inhumanity storyline. Before being revealed in canon, a leaked script revealed the fourth iteration's true identity to be Eric Brooks.

Bullseye

In the Hawkeye: Freefall storyline, Clint becomes Ronin once more to launch an attack on the Hood's criminal empire. The Hood eventually hires Bullseye to find out Ronin's true identity. After learning that Clint is Ronin through his associates, the Hood then orders Bullseye to commit crimes dressed in the Ronin costume to ruin Clint's reputation.

Other versions

Ultimate Marvel
The Ultimate Marvel equivalent of Ronin is an alternate personality of Marc Spector. In order to infiltrate the Kingpin's forces, Ronin proves himself by luring Spider-Man into a fight. The two engage in a brutal battle while Ronin and Moon Knight fight a concurrent battle in Spector's mind. Ronin knocks Spider-Man unconscious and apparently "kills" Moon Knight before taking the youth to the Kingpin for interrogation. However, the Kingpin attacks Ronin, revealing knowledge of Ronin's secret identity. Two of the Kingpin's henchmen take Ronin to a river and execute him. However, Ronin survives his near fatal injuries and goes to the police to provide evidence about the Kingpin's attempt to murder him. He is forced to reveal his identity, but the Kingpin is arrested and the media refer to Spector as a hero.

Heroes Reborn
In the "Heroes Reborn" miniseries, T'Challa briefly uses the Ronin identity to break into the Squadron Supreme's headquarters and steal files, only to be driven off by Nighthawk.

In other media

Television
An original character named Nozomu Akatsuki operates as Ronin in Marvel Disk Wars: The Avengers, voiced by Hideyuki Hori in the Japanese version and Keith Silverstein in the English dub. The father of Akira and Hikaru Akatsuki, Nozomu is the co-developer of the DISKS (Digital Identity Securement Kit) before becoming Ronin.

Marvel Cinematic Universe
Multiple versions of Ronin appear in media set in the Marvel Cinematic Universe. 
 In the film Avengers: Endgame, Clint Barton (portrayed by Jeremy Renner) becomes Ronin to take vengeance on criminals who survived the Blip, such as the Tracksuit Mafia, before he is recruited by Natasha Romanoff to join the Avengers in undoing the Blip.
 In the Disney+ series Hawkeye, Kate Bishop (portrayed by Hailee Steinfeld) stumbles onto a black market auction containing items taken from the Avengers' Compound and dons the Ronin suit when the Tracksuit Mafia attack before later returning it to Barton, who is forced to address consequences from his time as Ronin.
 Additionally, Maya Lopez (portrayed by Alaqua Cox) appears in the series as the leader of the Tracksuit Mafia who seeks revenge on Barton for killing her father.

Video games
 The Maya Lopez incarnation of Ronin appears as a playable character in the PSP version of Marvel: Ultimate Alliance, voiced by Marabina Jaimes. 
 The Clint Barton incarnation of Ronin appears as an alternate suit for Barton as Hawkeye in Ultimate Marvel vs. Capcom 3, Marvel Heroes, Marvel Avengers Academy and Marvel Ultimate Alliance 3: The Black Order.
 The Clint Barton incarnation of Ronin appears as a playable character in Marvel Future Fight, Marvel Contest of Champions, and Marvel's Avengers.
 The Eric Brooks incarnation of Ronin appears as a playable character in Lego Marvel's Avengers.

Toys
 A Minimate of Ronin was released in the 12th series of Marvel Minimates, in a 2-pack with a battle damaged "Riot-Attack" variant of Spider-Man.
 Marvel Legends released a 2-pack of the Clint Barton incarnation of Ronin and Elektra.
 Marvel Universe released a Ronin figure.

References

External links
 Ronin at Marvel.com
 
 
 Ronin at Marvel Wiki

Marvel Comics martial artists
Fictional ninja
Fictional swordfighters in comics
Characters created by Joe Quesada
Vigilante characters in comics